Kalonda is a village and municipality in the Lučenec District in the Banská Bystrica Region of Slovakia.

Genealogical resources

The records for genealogical research are available at the state archive "Statny Archiv in Banska Bystrica, Slovakia"

 Roman Catholic church records (births/marriages/deaths): 1724-1896 (parish B)
 Lutheran church records (births/marriages/deaths): 1783-1895 (parish B)

See also
 List of municipalities and towns in Slovakia

External links

Surnames of living people in Kalonda

Villages and municipalities in Lučenec District